Cornelius Meaney (8 December 1890 – 11 September 1970) was an Irish Fianna Fáil politician who served as a Teachta Dála (TD) from 1937 to 1943 and 1961 to 1965.

Meaney was first elected as a Fianna Fáil TD for the Cork North constituency at the 1937 general election. He was re-elected at the 1938 general election but lost his seat at the 1943 general election. He was an unsuccessful candidate at the 1944, 1948 and 1951 general elections. He contested the 1961 general election and was elected for the Cork Mid constituency. He retired at the 1965 general election, and his son Thomas Meaney succeeded him as the Fianna Fáil TD for Cork Mid.

See also
Families in the Oireachtas

References

1970 deaths
Fianna Fáil TDs
Members of the 9th Dáil
Members of the 10th Dáil
Members of the 17th Dáil
Politicians from County Cork
Irish farmers
1890 births